Doreen Chen is a Jamaican politician.

Political career 
On 11 October 2000, her political opponent Alfred Chen (of no relation) was killed in a helicopter crash.

References 

20th-century births
Living people
Year of birth missing (living people)
20th-century Jamaican women politicians
20th-century Jamaican politicians
21st-century Jamaican women politicians
21st-century Jamaican politicians
People from Trelawny Parish
Members of the House of Representatives of Jamaica
People's National Party (Jamaica) politicians